In mathematics, the coshc function appears frequently in papers about optical scattering, Heisenberg spacetime and hyperbolic geometry. For , it is defined as

It is a solution of the following differential equation:

Properties 
The first-order derivative is given by

The Taylor series expansion is

The Padé approximant is

In terms of other special functions 
 , where  is Kummer's confluent hypergeometric function.
, where  is the biconfluent Heun function.
 , where  is a Whittaker function.

Gallery

See also

 Tanc function
 Tanhc function
 Sinhc function

References

Special functions